Sheffield Elite is an English basketball club and academy from Sheffield, South Yorkshire. Elite compete in the English Basketball League, Division 3 North and the team's head coach is Peter Scantlebury.

History

Sabres (2001–2021)
The Sabres entered NBL Division 2 North in 2001, effectively as a "spin off" second team for the Sheffield Sharks.who played in the BBL. The team initially struggled, finishing bottom of the league twice. With close links to Sheffield Hallam University, they had problems with matches near the start and end of terms, and during busy periods such as exams. They failed to complete all their matches in both their first and third seasons, and in 2003-4 they also forfeited no less than five games through late cancellation, thus playing only 15 of their 22 scheduled matches.

2004–5 proved much better for the Sabres, with a completed schedule and a fifth-place finish in Division 3 North, they built on this the following season as the Sharks junior programme became an integral part of the tie-up between the clubs. This enabled younger players to gain experience at Senior level, with several of the Juniors regularly playing for the Sabres.

This policy paid dividends in 2006, with a third-placed finish, and an appearance in the Division 3 Championship Final, and they remained competitive, finishing third again in 2010.

Elite (2021–present)
In 2021, the Sabres merged with the academy at Sheffield College to form Sheffield Elite.

Season-by-season records

References

Basketball teams in England